Montanus was the second century founder of Montanism. 

Montanus is also a Latin word meaning mountain (as an adjective) and other uses of the word are as follows:

Latinised version of surnames meaning "mountain"
Lucius Venuleius Montanus Apronianus (1st century AD), Roman senator
Alpinus Montanus (1st century AD), of the Treviri, a tribe of the Belgae, commander of a Roman cohort 
Arnoldus Montanus (c.1625–1683), Dutch teacher and author
Benedictus Arias Montanus or Benito Arias Montano (1527–1598), Spanish orientalist
Jan Simonides Montanus (c.1535-1587), Czech composer
Johannes Baptista Montanus (1498–1551), Italian physician and medical writer
Johannes Scultetus Montanus (1531-1604), Silesian Paracelsist
Reginaldus Gonsalvius Montanus, pseudonym of Casiodoro de Reina (c.1520–1594), Spanish Lutheran theologian
Saint Montanus, one of the Martyrs of Carthage under Valerian.
Fictional
Erasmus Montanus (1722), play by Ludvig Holberg and Latinised name of its lead character Rasmus Berg

Second element of species names

Frogs
Alsodes montanus
Astylosternus montanus
Batrachylodes montanus
Cophixalus montanus
Eleutherodactylus montanus
Hyperolius montanus
Platymantis montanus

Other animals
Adaina montanus, moth
Aenetus montanus, moth
Agapetus montanus, caddisfly
Blennidus montanus, beetle
Caelostomus montanus, beetle
Chalcides montanus, skink
Cybaeus montanus, spider
Deretrachys montanus, beetle
Eremias montanus, lizard
Euscorpiops montanus, scorpion
Hemicrepidius montanus, beetle
Henricus montanus, moth
Ilybius montanus, beetle
Mirosternus montanus, beetle
Monosyntaxis montanus, moth
Orachrysops montanus, butterfly
Orthogonius montanus, beetle
Orthops montanus, plant bug
Paradoxurus montanus, civet
Porcellio montanus, woodlouse
Scotinotylus montanus, sheet weaver (spider)
Synuchus montanus, beetle
Thestor montanus, butterfly
Trochulus montanus, snail

Plants and fungi
Acanthus montanus, or mountain thistle
Anthodiscus montanus, family Caryocaraceae
Callistemon montanus, or mountain bottlebrush
Cercocarpus montanus, or mountain mahogany
Goniothalamus montanus, family Annonaceae
Lentinellus montanus, agaric fungus in the family Auriscalpiaceae
Leptosiphon montanus, phlox family
Oxyanthus montanus, family Rubiaceae
Pandanus montanus, family Pandanaceae
Phyllanthus montanus,  family Euphorbiaceae
Pseudaraeococcus montanus, family Bromeliaceae
Tylopilus montanus, bolete fungus in the family Boletaceae

See also
Montana (disambiguation)
Montanum (disambiguation)